The 32nd Producers Guild of America Awards (also known as 2021 Producers Guild Awards or 2021 PGA Awards), honoring the best film and television producers of 2020, were held virtually on March 24, 2021. The nominations in the documentary category were announced on February 2, 2021, the nominees in the sports, children's and short-form categories were announced on February 26, 2021, and the remaining nominations for film and television were announced on March 8, 2021. The finalists for the PGA Innovation Award were announced on March 17, 2021.

Winners and nominees

Film

Television

PGA Innovation Award

References

External links
 PGA Awards website

 2020
Producers Guild of America Awards
Producers Guild of America Awards